ESOL may refer to:

 English for Speakers of Other Languages, the use or study of English by speakers of other languages
 Existential second-order logic, a fragment of second order logic consisting only of existential second-order formulas